Vladimir Petrukhin (full name: Vladimir Yakovlevich Petrukhin, ; born on July 25, 1950 in Pushkino, Moscow Oblast, Soviet Union) is a Russian historian, archaeologist and ethnographer, Doctor of Historical Sciences (since 1994), chief research fellow of the Medieval Section in the Institute of Slavic Studies in the Russian Academy of Sciences, professor of Higher School of Economics.

BiographyVladimir Petrukhin, official website of the Institute of Slavic Studies of the Russian Academy of Sciences.

Vladimir Petrukhin was born on July 25, 1950 in Pushkino, Moscow Oblast.

 1957–1965 – First High School in Pushkino.
 1962–1967 – Young Archaeologists Club in Museum of History and Reconstruction of Moscow.
 1967 – graduated from Fifth High School in Pushkino with a silver medal.
 1967–1972 – student of Faculty of History of the Moscow State University.
 1972 – graduated from the Faculty of History, qualification as historian, teacher of history and social science with knowledge of foreign language.
 1972–1975 – postgraduate student at the Department of Archeology of Faculty of History (prof. Daniil Avdusin was a doctoral advisor).
 1975 – defended a candidate thesis The Funeral Cult of Pagan Scandinavia (prof. Daniil Avdusin was a doctoral advisor); academic degree of Candidate of Historical Sciences was conferred.
 1975–1992 – superior editor, scientific editor, senior scientific editor in the Editorial Office of Archaeology and Ethnography and the Editorial Office of World History of publisher "Soviet Encyclopedia".
 1991–2004 – professor of Dubnov Higher School for the Humanities (until 2003 it was Jewish University in Moscow).
 since 1992 – superior, senior, chief research fellow of Institute of Slavic Studies (until 1995 it was Institute of Slavic and Balkan Studies) of the Russian Academy of Sciences.
 1994 – defended a doctoral thesis The Problems of Ethnic and Cultural History of Slavs and Rus in the 9th–11th Centuries in Institute of Slavic and Balkan Studies; academic degree of Doctor of Historical Sciences was conferred.
 since 1992 – member of the academic council of the Center for University Teaching of Jewish Civilization "Sefer".
 1997–2015 professor of the Department of Russian History of Middle Ages and Modern Period (until 2007 – the Department of Russian History of Ancient World and Middle Ages, until 2013 – the Department of Russian History of Middle Ages and Early Modern Period) in History and Archives Institute in the Russian State University for the Humanities.
 2004 – Ministry of Education of Russia conferred to Vladimir Petrukhin the academic status of professor in the Department of Russian History of Ancient World and Middle Ages.
 since 2008 – professor of School of History in Faculty of Humanities in Higher School of Economics.

Vladimir Petrukhin was awarded Diploma of Open Society Institute (1996) for the victory in the contest "New Books on Social Sciences and Humanities for High School"; Medal of Slavic Fund of Russia (2010) for the great contribution to the preservation and development of the heritage of Cyril and Methodius; Likhachov Prize (2015) for monograph Rus in the 9th–10th Centuries. From Varangians Invitation to the Сhoice of Faith.

Researches

Vladimir Petrukhin researches Russian medieval history, archaeology and culture (Slavs, Scandinavians, Khazars) (including Old Rus), ethnography of North and East Europe (Slavs, Jews, Finnic peoples). The research works is characterized by complex approach and a use of all sources. Vladimir Petrukhin created new conception of early Russian history, in which geopolitics, ethnic and cultural history were key points (monographs: The Beginning of Ethnic and Cultural History of Rus in the 9th–11th Centuries, 1995; Rus in the 9th–10th Centuries. From Varangians Invitation to the Сhoice of Faith, 2013, 2014).

 Vladimir Petrukhin takes part in many Russian and international historical, archaeological and ethnographic projects, including interdisciplinary expeditions to study of Slavic and Jewish history and culture; he also is a coordinator of projects for preservation and study of the Khazarian and Jewish historical and cultural artefacts in Dubnov Higher School for the Humanities ("Khazarian Project") of the Russian Jewish Congress.
 Member of editorial boards of some journals: "Bulletin of Jewish University" (Moscow – Jerusalem, since 1994), "Slavic Studies" ("Slavyanovedeniye", Moscow, since 1994), "Living Antiquity" ("Zhivaya Starina", Moscow, since 1995), "Problems of Art" ("Problemi na Izkustvoto", Sofia, Bulgaria, since 2004), almanac "Parallels" (since 2002), "Khazarian Almanac" (Kharkiv, Ukraine, since 2002); many collected articles and other scientific publications.
 Member of organizing committees of several Russian and international conferences on Russian and Khazarian history and archaeology and also Eastern European ethnography.
 In Russian State University for the Humanities since 1997, Vladimir Petrukhin gives courses of lectures on the early history of Russia, special courses on religious antiquities, ethnogenesis and early history of the Slavs; he manages an archaeological field practice of students. In Dubnov Higher School for the Humanities, he gives courses of lectures on the history of Russia in the Antiquity and the Middle Ages, on introduction to archaeology, he also manages an archaeological field practice of students. In the Institute of Asian and African Studies of the Moscow State University), he gives a special course "Khazars and the Early History of the Jews in Eastern Europe".
 Vladimir Petrukhin is an author of more than 500 research works, published from 1973 to the present time, among them he took part in the work for the "Slavic Antiquities. Ethnolinguistic Dictionary" (ed. by Nikita Tolstoy); an author of several popular scientific books.

Main publications

Monographs, co-authorship and popular scientific publications 

 The Beginning of Ethnic and Cultural History of Rus in the 9th–11th Centuries / Russian Academy of Sciences, Institute of Slavic and Balkan Studies. Smolensk ; Moscow, 1995. 317 p..
 From Genesis to Exodus : the Biblical Subjects in Jewish and Slavic Folk Culture : Collected Articles / Sefer. Academic series ; editor-in-chief is Vladimir Petrukhin. Moscow, 1998. Issue 2..
 Old Rus. Moscow, 2000. 48 p. (Series: How and Why Wonder Books)..
 Slavs : Textbook for Additional Education. Moscow, 2002. 112 p..
 The Origins of Russia : Historical Stories / V. Petrukhin, A. Toroptsev. Moscow, 2002. 132 p. (А. Торопцев. – М. : Росмэн, 2002. – 132 с.
 Khazarian and Hebrew Documents of the 10th Century : Translation from Russian into English / Norman Golb, Omeljan Pritsak ; scientific ed., afterword and commentaries by Vladimir Petrukhin ; Russian Academy of Sciences, Institute of Slavic Studies. 2nd edition, corrected and supplemented. Jerusalem ; Moscow, 2003. 239 p. (Series: Library of Russian Jewish Congress). First edition : Khazarian Hebrew Documents of the Tenth Century / N. Golb a. O. Pritsak. Ithaca; London : Cornell Univ. Press, 1982..
 Essays on the History of the Peoples of Russia in Antiquity and the Early Middle Ages : Manual for Humanitarian Faculties / Vladimir Petrukhin, Dmitry Rayevsky. Moscow, 2004. 415 p. ).
 Myths of Finno-Ugric Peoples. Moscow, 2005. 463 p..
 Migration Period / Vladimir Petrukhin and others. Moscow, 2005. 179 p..
 Old Rus. From 9th Century to 1263. Moscow, 2005. 190 p..
 Origin Myths. Moscow, 2005. 464 p..
 Before the Invasion. Moscow, 2005. 179 p..
 Christianization of Rus : from Paganism to Christianity. Moscow, 2006. 222 p..
 Old Rus. Moscow, 2008. 95 p..
 The "Jewish Myth" in the Slavic Culture / Olga Belova, Vladimir Petrukhin. Moscow ; Jerusalem, 2008. 568 p..
 Folklore and Book-Learning : Myth and Historical Reality / Olga Belova, Vladimir Petrukhin ; Russian Academy of Sciences, Institute of Slavic Studies. Moscow, 2008. 262 p..
 Underworld : Myths of Different Peoples. Yekaterinburg, 2010. 414 p. ; Idem. Moscow, 2010. 414 p..
 The History of the Jewish People in Russia. Moscow ; Jerusalem, 2010. (Co-author)..
 The Myths Of Ancient Scandinavia. Moscow, 2011. 463 p..
 "Rus and All the Peoples" : the Aspects of Historical Relationships : Historical and Archaeological Essays. Moscow, 2011. 384 p..
 Khazaria in Cross-Cultural Space : the Historical Geography of Fortress Architecture, the Choice of Faith / Tatyana Kalinina, Valery Flyorov, Vladimir Petrukhin. Moscow, 2014. 208 p. (Russian: Хазария в кросскультурном пространстве : историческая география, крепостная архитектура, выбор веры / Т.М. Калинина, В.С. Флёров, В.Я. Петрухин. – М. : Рукописные памятники Древней Руси, 2014. – 208 с.).
 Rus in the 9th–10th Centuries. From Varangians Invitation to the Сhoice of Faith / 2nd edition, corrected and supplemented. Moscow, 2014. 464 p..

Some articles 

 Melnikova, Elena. Petrukhin, Vladimir. "The Legend of the Varangians Invitation" in Comparative Historical Perspective // 11th All-Union Conference on the Study of History, Economics, Literature and Language of the Scandinavian Countries and Finland / ed. by Yury Andreev and others. – Moscow, 1989. – Issue 1. – P. 108–110..
 Древо жизни: Библейский образ и славянский фольклор // Живая старина. – 1997. – № 1. – С. 8–9.
 Дунайская предыстория славян и начальная Русь // Истоки русской культуры : Археология и лингвистика. – М., 1997. – С. 139–144.
 «От тех варяг прозвася…» // Родина. – 1997. – № 10. – С. 12–16.
 Походы Руси на Царьград: К проблеме достоверности летописи // Восточная Европа в древности и средневековье: Материалы конф. … – М., 1997. – С. 65–70.
 Мельникова Е.А., Петрухин В.Я. Русь и чудь: К проблеме этнокультурных контактов Восточной Европы и Балтийского региона в 1 -м тыс. н. э. // Балтославянские исследования, 1988–1996. – М., 1997. – С. 40–51.
 Большие курганы Руси и Северной Европы: К проблеме этнокультурных связей в раннесредневековый период // Историческая археология: традиции и перспективы. – М., 1998. – С. 361–369.
 К дохристианским истокам древнерусского княжеского культа // ΠΟΛΥΤΡΟΠΟΝ: К 70-летию В. Н. Топорова. – М., 1998. – С. 882–892.
 Выбор веры: Летописный сюжет и исторические реалии // Древнерусская культура в мировом контексте: археология и междисциплинарные исследования: Материалы конф. … – М., 1999. – С. 73–85.
 Древняя Русь: Народ. Князья. Религия // Из истории русской культуры. – М.: Яз. рус. культуры, 2000. – Т. I: (Древняя Русь). – С. 13–410. – (Язык. Семиотика. Культура).
 «Боги и бесы» русского средневековья: род, рожаницы и проблема древнерусского двоеверия // Славянский и балканский фольклор. Народная демонология / Отв. ред. С.М. Толстая. – М., 2000. – С. 314–343.
 «Русский каганат», скандинавы и Южная Русь: средневековая традиция и стереотипы современной историографии // Древнейшиие государства Восточной Европы. 1999 г. Восточная и Северная Европа в средневековье / Отв. ред. Г.В. Глазырина ; Отв. секретарь С.Л. Никольский ; [Отв. ред. сер. Е.А. Мельникова]. – М.: Вост. лит., 2001 – С. 127–142. (Памяти Т. С. Нунена).
 Легенда о призвании варягов и балтийский регион // Древняя Русь. Вопросы медиевистики. – 2008. – № 2 (32). – С. 41–46.
 Early Slavs and Rus’ in the Balkans (6–10th Centuries): First Contacts with the World of Civilization (Summary of article) on website of Association Internationale d'Etudes du Sud-Est Europeen.

External links 

 Vladimir Petrukhin, official website of the Institute of Slavic Studies of the Russian Academy of Sciences.
 Vladimir Petrukhin, official website of the Center for University Teaching of Jewish Civilization "Sefer".
 About Vladimir Petrukhin on Khazaria.com (The American Center of Khazars Studies).

Videos of lectures

 Хазария и Русь // Sefer.
 Евреи в Хазарии. Проблема обращения хазар // Sefer.
 Выбор веры у хазар // PostScience.
 Выбор веры на Руси // PostScience.
 Рагнарёк // PostScience.
 Университетские субботы РГГУ: Владимир Петрухин, Славяно-русская археология на пути из варяг в греки // PRESSCENTRERGGU.
 Варяги придали смысл политической жизни на Руси. Вопросы истории // Русский Радио Эфир.
 История России // Pravda.
 Гордон №206 Становление древнерусского государства // Саша Гордонский.
 Хазары и Русь [Гордон] // Исторический Лекторий.
 Евгений Сатановский. Владимир Петрухин // Сатановский Евгений Янович.
 Евгений Сатановский. «От двух до пяти» (полный эфир) Вести.ФМ 21.10.2015.
 Интеллигенция и власть.
 Петрухин В. Судьбы евреев в средневековой Руси. От «кенаанитов» к «жидовствующим» // Летняя школа по еврейской этнографии и эпиграфике в Глубоком (Белоруссия). 22–30 июля 2015 г. Sefer.
 Петрухин В. Вий в Талмуде // Конференция Центра Сэфер и Центра славяно-иудаики Института славяноведения РАН «Норма и аномалия в славянской и еврейской культурной традиции». 2–4 декабря 2015 г.
 Prof. Vladimir Petrukhin. On the Jews in Old Russian sources and modern historiographical issues. Colloquium "Religious Intolerance and Anti-Judaism Discourses in the Christian Culture of the West and the East of Europe in the Middle Ages", December 9, 2015, Moscow, Higher School of Economics.
 Евгений Сатановский и Владимир Петрухин: В русской истории нет никакой русофобии (2016).

Notes

Living people
1950 births
Finno-Ugrists
Historians of Russia
Judaic scholars
Researchers of Slavic religion
Archaeologists from Moscow
Russian ethnographers
20th-century Russian historians
Russian medievalists
Russian State University for the Humanities
Academic staff of the Higher School of Economics
21st-century Russian historians